Martin John James Johnson (21 March 1906–1977) was an English footballer who played in the Football League for Bradford (Park Avenue), Durham City, Sheffield United and Wolverhampton Wanderers.

References

1906 births
1977 deaths
English footballers
Association football forwards
English Football League players
Sunderland A.F.C. players
Durham City A.F.C. players
Bradford (Park Avenue) A.F.C. players
Sheffield United F.C. players
Wolverhampton Wanderers F.C. players
Spennymoor United F.C. players
North Shields F.C. players
Blyth Spartans A.F.C. players